Apocalypso is a novel by the British author Robert Rankin.

A crack team of paranormal investigators are dispatched to recover a crashed spaceship from the bottom of the Pacific Ocean.

According to his autobiography, I, Robert,  Rankin was unhappy with how he portrayed certain characters within this story. Before releasing the book on his own E-imprint, he edited out numerous jokes which he felt to be unsavory.

References

Novels by Robert Rankin
1998 British novels
British horror novels
Doubleday (publisher) books